Mahmoud Samir may refer to:

 Mahmoud El Sayed Samir (born 1983), Egyption footballer with El Dakhleya
 Mahmoud Samir (footballer) (born 1985), Egyptian footballer with Al-Ittihad Al-Sakandary
 Mahmoud Samir (fencer) (born 1981), Egyptian fencer